The Czech Republic national under-21 speedway team is the national under-21 motorcycle speedway team of the Czech Republic and is controlled by the Autoklub of the Czech Republic. The team started in Under-21 World Cup in all editions, but only one was a medal - bronze in 2007. The Individual competition was won by Antonín Kasper, Jr. (1982) and Lukáš Dryml (2002).

Competition

See also 
 Czech Republic national speedway team
 Czech Republic national under-19 speedway team

External links 
 (cs) Autoklub of the Czech Republic webside

National speedway teams
Speedway U-21
Team